88th meridian may refer to:

88th meridian east, a line of longitude east of the Greenwich Meridian
88th meridian west, a line of longitude west of the Greenwich Meridian